Mike Johnston (born February 19, 1957) is a Canadian ice hockey coach who currently serves as head coach, vice president and general manager of the Portland Winterhawks of the Western Hockey League. Johnston led the Winterhawks to four consecutive WHL Finals appearances, including a championship in 2013.

After six historic seasons in Portland, Johnston was hired as the head coach of the Pittsburgh Penguins of the National Hockey League (NHL). He spent one plus season as the bench boss of the Penguins before returning to Portland in an elevated role.
 
During Johnston's nine years in Portland, he helped 28 Winterhawks get drafted into the NHL, including eight players being selected in the first round. Before his tenure with Portland, he worked for Team Canada and spent nearly a decade as an assistant and associate coach with the Vancouver Canucks (1999–2006) and the Los Angeles Kings (2006–2008). [1]  Currently he is a "Hockey Player Development" instructor for the online sports-career training school Sports Management Worldwide, founded and run by Dr. Lynn Lashbrook.

Coaching career
Johnston initially started coaching at the College and University level in Canada. He coached college hockey in Alberta for five seasons before becoming the head coach of the University of New Brunswick from 1989 – 1994, winning two McAdam Division titles, and finishing with three first-place finishes and an overall record of 77–44–6. He was named the 3M Coach of the Year in 1994 and won the Telegraph Journal Coach of the Year Award in 1993.

Internationally, Johnston worked for Team Canada for five seasons from 1994 to 1999 serving in the capacity of general manager and associate coach and finally head coach for the 1998–1999 season, and was an assistant coach at the 1998 Winter Olympic Games in Nagano, Japan. In addition to the championships at the senior level, Johnston won three gold medals as head coach for Canada at the Spengler Cup Tournament and two World Junior Championships as an assistant coach in 1994 and 1995.

In 1994 he became general manager and associate coach of the Canadian national men's hockey team. In 1998 he became the head coach for one season. He then spent six seasons as, at first, an assistant coach and then as an associate coach with the Vancouver Canucks. During Johnston's time in Vancouver, the Canucks made four straight trips to the postseason and won the Northwest Division in 2003–2004. After that, he was an associate coach of the Los Angeles Kings.

Western Hockey League
Johnston was the coach and general manager of the Portland Winterhawks of the WHL from 2008 to 2014, where he amassed a record of 231–114–10–10, landing him second on the Winterhawks' all-time wins list.

In his second season with the Hawks in 2009–10, Johnston guided the team to a 48-point improvement from the prior season, a franchise record, and an appearance in the second round of the playoffs. The Winterhawks topped the 100-point barrier in 2010–11 with 103 points, a U.S. Division title and then their first of four straight trips to the WHL championship series.

After 102 points in 2011–12, they advanced to the WHL championship and the first of their three straight WHL Finals series against the Edmonton Oil Kings. In 2012–13 the Winterhawks had their greatest season in team history, with franchise records of 57 wins and 117 points, and a league record 29 road wins, as they won the third WHL championship in franchise history and advanced to the final of the 2013 Memorial Cup. In 2013–14 the Winterhawks set another franchise record under Johnston, with a 21-game winning streak as they amassed 113 points and their fourth consecutive trip to the championship series. Johnston returned to the Winterhawks for the 2016–17 season as head coach, general manager and vice president of the team. In his first year back with the Winterhawks, Portland amassed 40 wins for the sixth straight season under Johnston.

Suspension
After an investigation by the Canadian Hockey League, Johnston was suspended by the Western Hockey League for the duration of the 2012–13 WHL season, after it was revealed he offered improper player benefits and committed various recruitment violations over a four-year period. Some of the noted improper benefits Johnston offered to Winterhawk players included paying for their families to come to Portland multiple times during the season by subsidizing travel costs to the city, financing private summer training programs and providing cellular telephones to the team captains. As a result of the violations, Johnston was forced to hand over his general manager and head coaching positions to assistant coach Travis Green, who would guide the club to the Ed Chynoweth Cup. As a punishment for violating league rules, the team was forced to forfeit the first five rounds of the 2013 WHL Bantam Draft, along with their first round draft picks until 2017. The investigation into Johnston's conduct came months after the Ontario Hockey League's Windsor Spitfires were fined for improper player benefits and recruitment violations. Johnston's suspension was lifted at the end of the season.

Pittsburgh Penguins
Johnston was hired as the head coach of the Pittsburgh Penguins on June 25, 2014. During the 2014–15 season, the Penguins stormed out of the gate to a 22–6–4 record, but as injuries started to mount, Pittsburgh began to struggle and finished the season eighth in the Eastern Conference. The Penguins would be eliminated in the first-round of the playoffs by the New York Rangers.

In his second season with Pittsburgh, the Penguins started the 2015–16 season 15–10–3, and Johnston was fired on December 12, 2015. In a team statement announcing the firing, general manager Jim Rutherford stated that he felt the team was "underachieving".

Johnston's combined record with the Penguins was 58–37–15.

Personal life
Johnston played hockey for Brandon University in Manitoba and Acadia University in Nova Scotia, and holds a master's degree in Coaching Science from Acadia University.

Johnston and his wife Myrna have two children, Gabby and Adam, who serves as a scout for the Portland Winterhawks.

Johnston is the uncle of professional hockey players, Ryan Johnston and Rebecca Johnston.

Awards and achievements
Spengler Cup Gold Medal – 1993
IIHF World Junior Championship Gold Medal- 1994, 1995
IIHF World Championships Bronze Medal – 1995
IIHF World Championships Silver Medal – 1996
Spengler Cup Gold Medal – 1993, 1997, 1998
IIHF World Championships Gold Medal – 1996, 1997, 2007 
IIHF World Championships Silver Medal- 2008
President's Cup/Ed Chynoweth Cup – 2013

Books
Johnston has authored three books with former NHL player Ryan Walter: Simply the Best: Insights and Strategies from the Great Hockey Coaches, Simply the Best: Players on Performance, and Hockey Plays and Strategies.

WHL coaching record

NHL coaching record

International coaching record

University head coaching record

References

External links
 

1957 births
Living people
Canada men's national ice hockey team coaches
Ice hockey people from Nova Scotia
Los Angeles Kings coaches
Pittsburgh Penguins coaches
Portland Winterhawks coaches
Sportspeople from Dartmouth, Nova Scotia
Vancouver Canucks coaches